This article deals with the phonology of Avestan. Avestan is one of the Iranian languages and retained archaic voiced alveolar fricatives. It also has fricatives rather than the aspirated series seen in the closely related Indo-Aryan languages.

Consonants

š versus rt
Avestan š continues Indo-Iranian *-rt-. Its phonetic value and its phonological status (one or two phonemes) are somewhat unclear.
The conditions under which change from -rt- to -š- occurs are fundamentally ill-defined. Thus, for example, Gathic/Younger ərəta/arəta ('establish') is a variant of aša but is consistently written with r t/. Similarly, arəti ('portion') and aši ('recompense'). But aməša ('immortal') is consistently written with š, while marəta ('mortal') is consistently written with r t. In some instances, a change is evident in only Younger Avestan. For example, the Gathic Avestan word for "bridge" is pərətūm, while in Younger Avestan it is pəšūm. Both are singular accusative forms, but when the word is singular nominative, the Younger Avestan variant is again (and all but once) with r t.

Benveniste suggested š was only a convenient way of writing /rt/ and should not be considered phonetically relevant. According to Gray, š is a misreading, representing /r r/, of uncertain phonetic value but "probably" representing a voiceless r.

He goes on to suggest that in writing, -rt- was restored when a scribe was aware of a morpheme boundary between the /r/ and /t/.

Vowels

Transcription
There are various conventions for transliteration of the Avestan alphabet.  We adopt the following one here.
Vowels:
a ā ə ə̄ e ē o ō å ą i ī u ū
Consonants:
k g γ x xʷ č ǰ t d δ θ t̰ p b β f
ŋ ŋʷ ṇ ń n m y w r s z š ṣ̌ ž h

The glides y and w are often transcribed as ii and uu, imitating Avestan orthography.

References

Bibliography

External links
 glottothèque - Ancient Indo-European Grammars online, an online collection of video lectures on Ancient Indo-European languages, including lectures on Avestan phonology

Phonology
Iranian phonologies